Palomo is a Chilean stratovolcano.

Palomo may also refer to:

 Palomo (surname)
 Palomo (horse), Simón Bolívar's horse
 Palomo (band), a Mexican band with Universal Music Latin Entertainment